James Buser (born 30 August 1979) is an Australian former professional rugby league footballer who played for the Canberra Raiders in the National Rugby League.

Buser made two first-grade appearances for Canberra, both in the 2002 NRL season. A West Belconnen player, he debuted in Canberra's round 16 win over the Penrith Panthers at Bruce Stadium, coming off the bench to score a try. He played again in the following round, a loss to the Sydney Roosters at Sydney Football Stadium.

References

External links
James Buser at Rugby League project

1979 births
Living people
Australian rugby league players
Canberra Raiders players